Thomas Foster (c.1720-65), of Elim, Jamaica, and Egham House, Surrey, was an English politician.

He was a Member (MP) of the Parliament of England for Bossiney 1741 and 1742 to 1747 and for Dorchester 1761 to 1765.

References

1720 births
1765 deaths
People from Surrey
Members of the Parliament of Great Britain for English constituencies